Tillotama Shome is an Indian actress. She was nominated for Best Supporting Actress at the 63rd Filmfare Awards for her role in A Death in the Gunj. In 2021, she won the Filmfare Award for Best Actress (Critics) for portraying a praiseworthy role Ratna in Sir at the 66th Filmfare Awards.

Career
Born in Kolkata, Shome grew up all over India since her father was with the Indian Air Force. She went to Delhi's Lady Shri Ram College and became a part of Arvind Gaur's Asmita theatre group. She moved to New York in the Autumn of 2004 for a master's program in educational theatre at New York University, where she remained until visiting Mumbai on holiday in February 2008. Thereafter, she took up residence in Mumbai and, after completing some outstanding projects in New York, she returned to India in May 2008. In New York, she also taught theatre to murder convicts at a high security US prison.  Shome is married to Kunal Ross, the nephew of Jaya Bachchan, thus making her the niece-in-law of Jaya and Amitabh Bachchan.

She played Alice in Mira Nair's feature film Monsoon Wedding, and played Deepa in Shadows of Time (Schatten der Zeit), directed by Florian Gallenberger. She played a nun in the Australian film The Waiting City by Claire McCarthy. Italo Spinelli's Gangor, based on Mahashweta Devi's novel, had her play a social worker. She also worked in Qaushiq Mukherjee's Tasher Desh. She played Mrs. Ahmadi in the Hindi political thriller film Shanghai directed by Dibakar Banerjee. About her performance in Shanghai Rediff wrote "Shome created one of this year's most heartbreaking performances in a Hindi film".

Her other roles have included Lara in Little Box of Sweets (directed by Meneka Das), Jaya in Long After (short film, directed by Afia Nathaniel) and Miraal in Butterfly (directed by Tanuj Chopra).

Her performance as a girl who is raised as a boy in Qissa  won her the best actress title in the New Horizons Competition of the seventh Abu Dhabi Film Festival (ADFF). She shared the title with Norwegian actress Julia Wildschutt.

Filmography

Achievements 

 Tillotama Shome won Best Actor Award at UK Asian Film Festival for her film Raahgir - The Wayfarers which was released in 2019.

References

External links

Indian film actresses
Living people
Actresses in Bengali cinema
Steinhardt School of Culture, Education, and Human Development alumni
21st-century Indian actresses
Actresses from Kolkata
Filmfare Awards winners
Year of birth missing (living people)